SwinDoe is an American rapper. His debut, self-titled album Swindoe reached #123 on the Billboard 200 in 2010.

Houston area rapper SwinDoe – originally from Tucson, AZ—made music industry history by running a global, Billboard charting campaign from his BlackBerry smart phone.  Publicizing his PIN (3079E65E) inside of a catchy jingle, he was able to sell his album through various BlackBerry themed websites from around the world.

Discography
Studio albums
 Swindoe'' (2010)

References

African-American male rappers
Living people
Musicians from Tucson, Arizona
Rappers from Arizona
Year of birth missing (living people)
21st-century American rappers
21st-century American male musicians
West Coast hip hop musicians
21st-century African-American musicians